Sanad or SANAD may refer to:

Places
Sanad, Bahrain, a place in Bahrain
Sanad (Čoka), a village in Serbia
Sanad, Tunisia, a place in Tunisia

People
Ali Sanad (born 1986), Qatari footballer
Maikel Nabil Sanad (born 1985), Egyptian-American political activist
Mohamed Sanad, Egyptian antenna scientist

Other uses
Sanad, the citations or "backings" used to verify the legitimacy of a hadith
SANAD, a film lab at the Abu Dhabi Film Festival
Sanad (deed), in British India, a deed granted to the native princely state rulers confirming them in their states, in return for their allegiance